Catocala marmorata, the marbled underwing, is a moth of the family Erebidae. The species was first described by William Henry Edwards in 1864. It is found in the United States from Vermont to South Carolina and west to Indiana and Illinois.

Adults are on wing from July to September depending on the location. There is probably one generation per year.

The larvae feed on Populus and Salix species.

References

External links
Species info

Moths described in 1864
marmorata
Moths of North America